Eric Nilsson (born 26 December 1926) was a Swedish middle-distance runner. He competed in the men's 3000 metres steeplechase at the 1952 Summer Olympics.

References

1926 births
Living people
Athletes (track and field) at the 1952 Summer Olympics
Swedish male middle-distance runners
Swedish male steeplechase runners
Olympic athletes of Sweden
Place of birth missing (living people)